Peter Boatwright  is Allan D. Shocker Professor of Marketing and New Product Development at the Tepper School of Business and also Director of the Integrated Innovation Institute at Carnegie Mellon University. He is co-author of The Design of Things to Come: How Ordinary People Create Extraordinary Products (co-authored with Jonathan Cagan and Craig M. Vogel) and Built to Love – Creating Products that Captivate Customers (co-authored with Jonathan Cagan), September 2010.

Academia
Boatwright has an M. S. in Statistics from University of Wisconsin, and both his MBA and Ph.D are from University of Chicago’s Booth School of Business. Boatwright’s scholarly articles are published in leading research journals in the fields of marketing, statistics, and management. He consults with a variety of companies, from Fortune 100 to entrepreneurial start-ups, on product strategy, innovation and brand strategy. Professor Boatwright has developed new statistical methods and additional theories of consumer behavior, spanning qualitative and quantitative methodologies. His expertise and teaching focus is on new product marketing, consumer marketing, and marketing research methods.  His formal approaches to opportunity identification and problem solving have been integrated into a diverse range of companies including International Truck/Navistar, Apple, P&G, Dormont Manufacturing, Bayer MaterialScience, Respironics, Nissan, MSA, Whirlpool, Lubrizol, Kennametal, Alcoa, RedZone Robotics, DesignAdvance Systems, New Balance, Industrial Scientific, and Giant Eagle.

Books
 Built to Love: Creating Products that Captivate Customers Co-authored with Jonathan Cagan Berrett-Koehler Publishers, September 2010 Reviews
 The Design of Things to Come: How Ordinary People Create Extraordinary Products Co-authored with Craig M. Vogel and Jonathan Cagan Wharton School Publishing/Pearson Education, 2005, 231 pages.   Excerpts. Review.

Selected journal articles
 Boatwright, Peter, Sharad Borle, and Joseph B. Kadane, “Common Value/Private Value Categories in Online Auctions: A Distinction without a Difference, ” Decision Analysis, Vol. 7, No. 1, March 2010, pp. 86–98. Abstract
 Boatwright, Peter, Seth Orsborn, and Jonathan Cagan,  “Quantifying Aesthetic Form Preference in a Utility Function”, accepted for publication at Journal of Mechanical Design.
 Boatwright, Peter, Jonathan Cagan, Dee Kapur, and Al Saltiel (2009)  “A Step by Step Process to Build Valued Brands”, Journal of Product and Brand Management, 18, 1, 38-49.
 Orsborn, Seth, Peter Boatwright and Jonathan Cagan (2008) “Identifying Product Shape Relationships Using Principal Component Analysis” Research in Engineering Design, 18, 4 (Jan), 163-180. Abstract
 Orsborn, Seth, Jonathan Cagan, and Peter Boatwright (2008) “A Methodology For Creating A Statistically Derived Shape Grammar Composed Of Non-Obvious Shape Chunk”, Research in Engineering Design, 18, 4 (Jan), 181-196. Abstract
 Lu, Jiang, Joseph B. Kadane, and Peter Boatwright (2008) “The Dirt on Bikes: An Illustration of CART Models for Brand Differentiation”, Journal of Product and Brand Management, 17, 5, 317-326. Abstract
 Boatwright, Peter, Ajay Kalra, and Wei Zhang (2008)  “Research Note: Should Consumers Use The Halo To Form Product Evaluations? ” Management Science, 54, 1 (Jan), 217-223.
 Boatwright, Peter, Sharad Borle, and Kirthi Kalyanam (2007), “Deconstructing Each Item’s Category Contribution, ” Marketing Science, 26, 3 (May–June), 1-15. Abstract
 Kadane, Joseph B., Galit Shmueli, Tom Minka, Sharad Borle, and Peter Boatwright (2006)  “Conjugate Analysis of the Conway-Maxwell-Poisson Distribution”, Bayesian Analysis, 1, 2, 363-374.
 Borle, Sharad, Peter Boatwright, Joseph Nunes, Joseph Kadane, and Galit Shmueli (2005) “Effect of Product Assortment Changes on Consumer Retention, ” Marketing Science, Vol 24, No. 4 (Fall), pp. 616–622. Abstract

References

External links
 Tepper School of Business
 Boatwright's Business Educators Member Profile

Living people
Year of birth missing (living people)
Carnegie Mellon University faculty
American non-fiction writers
 University of Wisconsin–Madison College of Letters and Science alumni
University of Chicago Booth School of Business alumni